Cat Ba may refer to:
 Cát Bà Island, an island in Vietnam
 Cát Bà National Park, a national park on Cát Bà Island
 Cát Bà (township), the main town on Cát Bà Island